Glen Eira Sports and Aquatic Centre (GESAC) is an aquatic centre that was developed by Hansen Yuncken and is owned by City of Glen Eira. It is a rival to Melbourne Sports and Aquatic Centre as it is contains a 50-metre outdoor pool, 25 metre indoor pool, water slides, leisure pools, gymnasium and a stadium. It was constructed at a total cost of $44m dollars, with significant contributions from Federal and Victorian State Governments.

It is the first indoor pool in Glen Eira.

History
In 2009, construction was approved and the pool had started to develop. It was opened on Monday 7 May 2012 at 6:00am.

References

External links
GESAC - Take a Tour

Sports venues in Victoria (Australia)
Sports venues in Melbourne
Sport in the City of Glen Eira
Buildings and structures in the City of Glen Eira